The North Korean Ambassador to Germany is the official representative of the Government in Pyongyang to the Government of Germany. The Ambassador lives in Berlin.

List of representatives

See also 
Germany–North Korea relations
List of ambassadors of North Korea to East Germany

References 

Germany
Korea North